Mega TV is an American free-to-air television network based in San Juan, Puerto Rico, owned by Spanish Broadcasting System (SBS). The network's flagship is WSBS-TV, a television station licensed to Key West, Florida, with studios also in Miami.

History 
Mega TV was launched on March 1, 2006. Its original slate of programming includes productions aimed to young Hispanic viewers. Mega TV seems to be following the same pattern traced by larger rivals such as the Hispanic Telemundo, Univision and Azteca nearly 25 years ago – creating its own television personalities.

In early 2007, the station cut 55 employees to save production costs. A vast majority of locally produced programs such as Desvelados, Xpediente, El Noticero, El Vacilon, Entre Fichas, and Mega Especiales, Puerta Astral ("Star Port") and Agenda del Inmigrante were supposedly placed on hiatus. The channel is scheduled for a summer run with changes in hosts and renamed Codigo Astral ("Star Code").

SBS has entered into agreements with other television stations to air Mega TV programming, including: WBWP-LD in West Palm Beach, Florida; WHDO-CD in Orlando, Florida; WFHD-LD in Tampa, Florida (future; currently, it is TBN repeater W36CO); WHDC-LD in Mount Pleasant, South Carolina; KODF-LD in Dallas, Texas; WOCK-CD in Chicago, Illinois; KLPS-LP in Palm Springs, California; KMCC in Laughlin, Nevada; WMEI in Arecibo, Puerto Rico; and KSDI-LD in Fresno, California. WHDO, WFHD, WHDC, KLPS, and KSDI show (or plan to show) Mega TV on digital subchannels. As of May 27, 2013, WOCK-CD in Chicago no longer carries Mega TV.

Programming
, Mega TV's original programming included:
Bayly
Antena Live
Agenda del Inmigrante
Dante Night Show
En Corte con Ricardo Corona
Ahora con Oscar Haza
El Arañazo
MegaNoticiero
La Corte del Pueblo
Cuéntame (2020) con Johnny Lozada y Ambar
Mega Cine Cubano
A Tacón Quita'o
Vamonos de Viaje
Cayo Hueso al Dia
Mega Kids (E/I programming)
TV Martí
22 Minutos
Conectao's por la Cocina 
Ceriani
Lo Mejor de La Radio en Mega TV
Puerta Astral/Código Astral
On The Street with Dariel Fernández
Latin Angels
Handyman
Xpediente
Show Business Extra
ESPN Deportes en Mega TV
El Circo de PR
El Vacilón de NY
Mundo Loco
Testigo Directo
Te Para Tres
Codigo Secreto
Esta es tu Casa con Natalia Cruz
 Mega News
 Corazones Guerreros con Natalia Denegri

Current affiliates
 WSBS-TV Channel 22 Key West, Florida (Mega TV O&O/flagship station)
 WTCV Channel 18.1 San Juan, Puerto Rico (Mega TV O&O)
 WVEO Channel 18.1 Aguadilla, Puerto Rico
 WVOZ-TV Channel 18.1 Ponce, Puerto Rico
 WORA-TV Channel 18.1 Mayagüez, Puerto Rico
 WACX Channel 55.11 Orlando, Florida
 WGCT-LD Channel 19.4 Tampa, Florida

Former affiliates
 KMCC Channel 34 Laughlin, Nevada (Now an Ion Affiliate)
 KLPS-LP channel 19 Indio, California (Now Defunct)
 KTBU Channel 55 Conroe, Texas (Now a Quest Affiliate sold to Tegna Inc.)
 WOCK-CD Channel 13 Chicago, Illinois (Now an Independent station)
 WBWP-LD Channel 57 West Palm Beach, Florida (Now an Independent station)
 KODF-LD Channel 27 Dallas, Texas (Now Silent)
 KUVM-LD Channel 10.5 Houston, Texas (now Wizebuy TV)
 WHDO-CD Channel 38.2 Orlando, Florida (Now BizTV)
 WFTV Channel 9.2 Orlando, Florida (Now Laff)
 W21AU-D Channel 21.1 Orlando, Florida (now Nuestra Visión)
 WSJU-TV Channel 31 San Juan, Puerto Rico (Now Defunct)
 WMEI Channel 14 Arecibo, Puerto Rico (Now Defunct) 
 WOST Channel 22 Mayagüez, Puerto Rico (Now an Azteca América affiliate)
 WATV-LD Channel 47 Orlando, Florida (Now an Azteca América affiliate)
KSDI-LD Channel 33 Fresno, California (Now a Telemax affiliate)
WHDC-LD Channel 12.2 Charleston, South Carolina (Subchannel now a Court TV affiliate)
 WTAM-LD Channel 30 Tampa, Florida (Now an Azteca América affiliate)

External links 
 

Hispanic and Latino American culture in Miami
Spanish-language television networks in the United States
Spanish Broadcasting System stations
Television channels and stations established in 2006
Spanish-language mass media in Florida